Is the 2011–12 UD Almería season.  The club plays in two tournaments: the Segunda División and the Copa del Rey. It is the first season since the club had been relegated from La Liga.

Squad
Retrieved on 2 September 2011

Youth team players

Transfers

In

Out

Player statistics

Squad stats 
Last updated on 5 June 2012.

|-
|colspan="14"|Players who have left the club after the start of the season:

|}

Top Scorers
Updated on 5 June

Disciplinary Record
Updated on 27 May

Season results

Segunda División

Results summary

Competitive

Preseason

Segunda División

Copa del Rey

References

Almeria
UD Almería seasons